Burnett Township may refer to:

 Burnett Township, Pope County, Arkansas
 Burnett Township, Antelope County, Nebraska

Township name disambiguation pages